Timothy Sheehy is the name of:

 Tim Sheehy (ice hockey) (born 1948), American Ice Hockey player
 Timothy Sheehy (Cork politician) (1855–1938), Irish Cumann na nGaedhael politician, represented Cork West
 Timothy Sheehy (Tipperary politician) (1895–1968), Irish Fianna Fáil politician, represented Tipperary